Oxyrhopus, the false coral snakes, is a genus of colubrid snakes that belong to the subfamily Dipsadinae. The genus is found in Central America and the northern part of South America, 
and it includes 15 distinct species.

Species
The following 15 species are recognized as being valid.
Oxyrhopus clathratus A.M.C. Duméril, Bibron & A.H.A. Duméril, 1854 -  Duméril's false coral snake	
Oxyrhopus doliatus A.M.C. Duméril, Bibron & A.H.A. Duméril, 1854 - Bibron's false coral snake
Oxyrhopus emberti Gonzales, Reichle & Entiauspe-Neto, 2020
Oxyrhopus erdisii  	
Oxyrhopus fitzingeri (Tschudi, 1845) - Fitzinger's false coral snake
Oxyrhopus formosus (Wied-Neuwied, 1820) - Formosa false coral snake, beautiful calico snake 	
Oxyrhopus guibei Hoge & Romano, 1977 	
Oxyrhopus leucomelas (F. Werner, 1916) - Werner's false coral snake	
Oxyrhopus marcapatae (Boulenger, 1902) - Boulenger's false coral snake
Oxyrhopus melanogenys (Tschudi, 1845) - Tschudi's false coral snake
Oxyrhopus occipitalis (Wied-Neuwied, 1824)
Oxyrhopus petolarius (Linnaeus, 1758) - forest flame snake
Oxyrhopus rhombifer A.M.C. Duméril, Bibron & A.H.A. Duméril, 1854 -  Amazon false coral snake	
Oxyrhopus trigeminus A.M.C. Duméril, Bibron & A.H.A. Duméril, 1854 - Brazilian false coral snake
Oxyrhopus vanidicus Lynch, 2009	

The former Oxyrhopus venezuelanus Shreve, 1947 is currently considered a synonym of Oxyrhopus doliatus.

Nota bene: In the above list, a binomial authority in parentheses indicates that the species was originally described in a genus other than Oxyrhopus.

Description
Species in the genus Oxyrhopus share the following characters:

Head distinct from neck. Eye moderate or small. Pupil vertically elliptic. Body cylindrical or slightly laterally compressed. Tail moderate or long.

Dorsal scales smooth, with apical pits, and arranged in 19 rows at midbody.

Maxillary teeth 10-15, subequal, followed after a gap by two enlarged grooved teeth, located just behind the posterior border of the eye.

References

Further reading
Freiberg M (1982). Snakes of South America. Hong Kong: T.F.H. Publications. 189 pp. . (Oxyrhopus, pp. 78–79, 104-105, 137 + photographs on pp. 135, 138, 190-191).
Wagler J (1830). Natürliches System der Amphibien, mit vorangehender Classification des Säugthiere und Vögel. Ein Beitrag zur vergleichenden Zoologie. Munich, Stuttgart, and Tübingen: J.G. Cotta. vi + 354 pp. + one plate. (Oxyrhopus, new genus, pp. 185–186). (in German and Latin).

Oxyrhopus
Reptiles of Central America
Reptiles of South America
Snake genera
Taxa named by Johann Georg Wagler